In mathematics, the Andreotti–Frankel theorem, introduced by , states that if  is a smooth, complex affine variety of complex dimension  or, more generally, if  is any Stein manifold of dimension , then 
 admits a Morse function with critical points of index at most n, and so  is homotopy equivalent to a CW complex of real dimension at most n. 

Consequently, if  is a closed connected complex submanifold of complex dimension , then  has the homotopy type of a CW complex of real dimension .
Therefore

and

This theorem applies in particular to any smooth, complex affine variety of dimension .

References

 Chapter 7.

Complex manifolds
Theorems in homotopy theory